Golden Section is an album by the British ambient dance band System 7, released in 1997.

Critical reception
The New York Times wrote that "System 7 makes cheerful midtempo dance music that usually relies on a bouncy, chugging beat ... Removed from the dance floor, the music has too little happening for too long." The Dallas Observer thought that "tracks like 'Exdreamist' are nothing more than psychedelia wrapping itself in drum 'n' bass beats and electronic ambience." The Plain Dealer concluded: "Dreamy, smooth and stimulating, this is sacred music for digital temples."

Track listing

References

External links 

 Golden Section • discography on the official System 7 website

1997 albums
System 7 (band) albums
Albums produced by Steve Hillage